Amrita Rao (born 7 June) is an Indian actress who is known primarily for her work in Hindi films. Rao made her acting debut in Ab Ke Baras (2002), which earned her a nomination for Filmfare Award for Best Female Debut in 2003. She subsequently appeared in several successful films including the romantic dramas Ishq Vishk (2003), Main Hoon Na (2004), Vivah (2006) and comedy thriller Masti (2004) eventually being "Bollywood's quintessential girl-next-door". She is the recipient of IIFA Award and two Stardust Awards.

She made her debut in the Telugu film industry with the film Athidhi (2007). In 2008, she appeared in the successful film Welcome to Sajjanpur, which won her Stardust Award for Best Actress. Post this, most of her films turned out to be commercial failures. She then appeared in the National Award winning film Jolly LLB (2013). Following this, she appeared in films including Singh Saab the Great (2013), Satyagraha (2013) and Thackeray (2019).

Rao appeared as the Judge on the reality show, Perfect Bride in 2009. She made her TV debut with the show Meri Awaaz Hi Pehchaan Hai in 2016. M. F. Husain pronounced Amrita Rao as his second muse and made several paintings dedicated to the actress's role in Vivah.

Early life
Rao has never publicised her birthday details. Hindustan Times reported her birthdate as 7 June. She comes from a Konkani-speaking Chitrapur Saraswat Brahmin family. Rao studied at Canossa Girls School, Andheri (Bombay) then to Sophia College (Mumbai) to pursue a graduate degree in Psychology but dropped out to pursue a modeling career. She has a younger sister Preetika Rao, who is also an actress.

Career

Debut, breakthrough and success (2002–2006)
Before starting her career as an actor, Rao along with her sister Preetika appeared in several commercials during her college days. Her first public appearance was in the music video for Alisha Chinai's song Woh Pyar Mera.

In 2002, Rao played her first leading role as Anjali Thapar in Raj Kanwar's fantasy thriller Ab Ke Baras alongside debutante Aarya Babbar. The film, which depicts the story of U.S based girl (played by Rao) having recurrent dreams of a parallel life in India, proved to be financially unsuccessful. Rao next starred alongside Ajay Devgn in the biographical period film The Legend of Bhagat Singh. In the film, which narrates the story of Indian independence Freedom Fighter Bhagat Singh, she played the role of Mannewali (Bhagat's fiancé). The film did not perform well at the box office, grossing only ₹129 million (US$2.7 million in 2002). In May 2003, Rao starred in the coming-of-age romance film Ishq Vishk opposite Shahid Kapoor, in her first of several collaborations with him, as a college student. The film became successful at the box office proving to be a breakthrough for Rao. Both the film and Rao's performance received critical acclaim. Rao's portrayal earned her Filmfare Best Female Debut Award (2003) and IIFA Award for Star Debut of the Year for Star Debut of the Year, (2004).

In 2004, Rao starred in three films. Her first release of the year was Indra Kumar's adult comedy Masti, opposite Vivek Oberoi. The film featured an ensemble cast (Ajay Devgn, Vivek Oberoi, Riteish Deshmukh, Aftab Shivdasani, Lara Dutta, Tara Sharma, and Genelia D'Souza) and earned around  worldwide. The film received a positive response from critics, and also did well at the box office. Rao's performance as over-possessive wife was well-received by critics. Rao next had a supporting role in the Farah Khan action comedy Main Hoon Na, where she co-starred alongside Shah Rukh Khan, Suniel Shetty, Sushmita Sen, and Zayed Khan. Her role as an army officer's daughter Sanjana (Sanju) Bakshi earned Rao Best Supporting Actress, her second Filmfare award nomination. Her third and final release of 2004 was Milan Luthria's action drama Deewar. Rao had a minor role named Radhika, Akshaye Khanna's love interest.

Rao co-starred in the 2005 drama Vaah! Life Ho Toh Aisi! alongside Shahid Kapoor. Critical response to the film was negative, although Rao garnered acclaim for her performance as a school teacher. That same year, Rao took the lead role in the John Matthew Matthan drama Shikhar, in which she portrayed Madhvi. She then appeared in the 2006 comedy Pyare Mohan, a film loosely based on the 1989 American film See No Evil, Hear No Evil, and her second collaboration with Vivek Oberoi. The movie received mixed reviews from critics; Rajeev Masand wrote, "Amrita hit career lows, producing the low-fashion chemistry".

Rao played the female lead role in Sooraj R. Barjatya's romantic drama Vivah (2006). The film depicted the journey of two individuals from engagement to marriage. In her fourth collaboration with Shahid Kapoor, Rao portrayed Poonam, a traditionally raised young woman. The film was given mixed reviews by most critics but became one of the highest-grossing films of the year, as well as Rao's biggest commercial success to date. Taran Adarsh wrote, "Amrita Rao gets a new lease of life with Vivah. She looks the character and is splendid all through." At the 13th Star Screen Awards, Rao received a Best Actress nomination.

Few success and setback (2007–2012)
Rao was cast alongside Mahesh Babu in the 2007 Telugu action film Athidhi. The film was directed and co-written by Surender Reddy. She received mostly positive reviews, with critics praising the chemistry between Rao and Mahesh Babu. Radhika Rajamani for Rediff.com noted, "Amrita Rao, who makes her debut in Telugu films, makes a mark." "Moviebuzz" for Sify wrote, "Amrita Rao is not only beautiful but also glamorous. She has proved that she could be yet another native girl of Tollywood. She emoted well with convincing histrionics fit for the Telugu screen."

Rao had two major releases in 2008: drama My Name Is Anthony Gonsalves opposite newcomer Nikhil Dwivedi, and Shyam Benegal's comedy film Welcome to Sajjanpur. My Name Is Anthony Gonsalves received overwhelmingly negative reviews and performed poorly at the box office. Rao's performance as an orphan who lives a middle-class lifestyle was praised by a few critics; OneIndia Entertainment noted, "Amrita Rao looks gorgeous, but her role isn't substantial enough." In Welcome to Sajjanpur, Rao played the role of Kamala, a woman who is desperate for communication from her husband Bansiram (Kunal Kapoor), a laborer at a dockyard in Mumbai. Successful in creating an impact at the box office, the film obtained positive reviews from critics and earned , making it the second-highest-grossing film in Rao's career. Hindustan Times noted, "Amrita Rao is sweetness personified." She received the first Stardust Best Actress Award for her performance. In the same year, Rao made a guest appearance as Nirja Rathore in the courtroom drama Shaurya.

Rao made her debut as a Judge with the 2009 television show Perfect Bride. She Judged the show alongside Shekhar Suman and Malaika Arora. She next starred with Harman Baweja in the 2009 film Victory. The film faced competition from other films such as Raaz 2 and Dev.D and failed to do well. With a huge budget, it only managed to gross  and was declared a disaster by Boxoffice-India. That same year, Rao took on the lead role in Neeraj Vora's comedy-drama Short Kut: The Con is On opposite Akshaye Khanna, produced by Anil Kapoor. The film stars Rao as Mansi, the girlfriend of Akshaye's character. Critical response towards the film and Rao's performance received negative reviews: Indian Express'''s Shubhra Gupta noted: "Everything is loud and plastic, and the actors all chant their lines at the top of their voices." Gaurav Malini of The Times of India stated, "Amrita Rao tries too hard to look hot but lacks oomph in every possible angle". Though having grossed its budget back, it was considered a financial disappointment.

Rao's only film of 2011 was Love U...Mr. Kalakaar! and her second collaboration with Rajshri Productions. The movie generated mostly negative reviews and emerged as a commercial failure. Though, her performance as the daughter of a businessman was praised by the critics. Nikhat Kazmi of The Times of India wrote, "Amrita Rao at best, but the film is so predictable and so long, it loses impact". In later years, Rao made special appearances in comedy-drama Heyy Babyy (2007), romantic-comedy Life Partner (2007), and science fiction romance Jaane Kahan Se Aayi Hai (2010).

Further career and recent work (2013–present)
In 2013, Rao starred in the national award-winning, courtroom, comedy-drama Jolly LLB. She played the lead role of Sandhya, the girlfriend of Arshad Warsi's character. The film received positive reviews and won the National Film Award for Best Feature Film in Hindi. Rao with limited performance in the film received average applause. Mohar Basu of Koimoi commented, "Amrita Rao could have been avoided in the film altogether. Though she is immensely pleasant, she and her role have nothing to contribute to the film".

Anil Sharma's action drama Singh Saab the Great was her next release. Co-starring alongside Sunny Deol, Rao played a journalist Shikha Chaturvedi. The film was largely panned by critics but Rao's performance earned positive reviews. Namrata Joshi of Outlook said, "Amrita Rao plays a role that feels like something she has already done, all the emotional support". Later that year, she appeared alongside Amitabh Bachchan, Ajay Devgn, Kareena Kapoor, Arjun Rampal, and Manoj Bajpai in Prakash Jha's political drama Satyagraha. Rao played the role of Sumitra, the daughter-in-law of Amitabh Bachchan's character. Rao was praised in particular; Resham Sengar of Zee News wrote, "Ms. Rao has the sweetly cherubic looks. She is convincing in most of the emotional scenes. But again, her scope of performance is just limited to mouthing a few important dialogues." The film was poorly received by critics and failed to make a profit at the box office.

Rao made her Television acting debut in 2016 with &TV's Meri Awaaz Hi Pehchaan Hai portraying the elder sister Kalyani Gaikwad. The story showed three generations of two sisters whose lives revolve around music. Her character's older version was played by Deepti Naval.

After a five-year absence from the screen, Rao played leading role in Abhijit Panse's Thackeray, a biopic based on a right-wing pro-Marathi politician Balasaheb Thackeray. Rao played the role of Meena Thackeray, wife of Balasaheb Thackeray. The film as well as Rao received mixed to negative reviews from critics. Shilpa Jamkhandikar of Reuters wrote, "Amrita Rao, who plays Thackeray's wife, has the cosmetic role of providing endless cups of tea to visitors and gaze at her husband dotingly".

 Personal life and media image 
Rao married her boyfriend, Anmol, a Radio Jockey after seven years of dating on 15 May 2016 in Mumbai. She gave birth to a baby boy, Veer on 1 November 2020. Rao has been part of many successful films and is often termed as "Bollywood's quintessential girl-next-door". In Times Most Desirable Women List, she ranked 24th in 2009 and 23rd in 2011. M. F. Husain pronounced Amrita Rao as his second muse 11 years after he painted Madhuri Dixit and made several paintings dedicated to the actress's role in Vivah'' (2006).

Filmography

Films

Television

Music videos

Awards and nominations

See also
List of Hindi film actresses

References

External links

 
 
 

Indian film actresses
Female models from Mumbai
Living people
21st-century Indian actresses
Actresses in Hindi cinema
Sophia College for Women alumni
Konkani people
Actresses from Mumbai
1981 births
International Indian Film Academy Awards winners